The Roman Bridge at Saint-Thibéry was a Roman bridge on the Via Domitia in southern France.

Construction 

The ancient bridge had nine arches with spans of 10–12 m. The roadway rested on wide piers, which were protected on both sides by arched floodways and large cutwaters. The missing spans are known to have been destroyed by a flood some time before 1536.

The remaining arches, with a span to rise ratio of 3.3:1 (115°) or more, show a visibly flatter profile than the semi-circular arches usually preferred by Roman engineers (180°). The rib thickness varies between one-tenth to one-twentieth of the span, corresponding to a common ratio also observed at a number of other Roman stone bridges. The structure is dated to the reign of emperor Augustus. Immediately upstream an old water mill and its millrace is located.

See also 
 List of Roman bridges
 Roman architecture
 Roman engineering

References

Sources

External links 

 
 Traianus – Technical investigation of Roman public works

Roman bridges in France
Roman segmental arch bridges
Deck arch bridges
Stone bridges in France
Buildings and structures in Hérault
Transport in Occitania (administrative region)
Tourist attractions in Hérault